The 2018 Karaliaus Mindaugo taurė, also known as SIL – Karaliaus Mindaugo taurė for sponsorship purposes, was the third edition of the Lithuanian King Mindaugas Cup. On 7 December 2017 it was announced that Klaipėda would host the tournament.

Žalgiris was the defending champions. Žalgiris successfully defended its title after beating BC Lietuvos rytas in the Final.

Format changes
After a lot of criticism during last year's tournament Lithuanian Basketball League changed distribution of quarterfinals games venues, awarding them directly to seeded teams instead of previously held open draw. LKL Cheerleaders Battles final was added to complement the event alongside traditional Three-point and Slam Dunk contests.

Draw
The draw of the 2018 Karaliaus Mindaugo taurė will be held on 16 January 2018.

Qualified teams
Eight highest ranked teams after the first half of the 2017–18 LKL regular season will qualify to the tournament.

Bracket

Quarter-finals

Neptūnas Klaipėda vs. Dzūkija Alytus

Lietkabelis Panevėžys vs. Pieno žvaigždės Pasvalys

Žalgiris Kaunas vs. Šiauliai

Lietuvos rytas Vilnius vs. Juventus Utena

Semi-finals

Dzūkija Alytus vs. Lietuvos rytas Vilnius

Žalgiris Kaunas vs. Lietkabelis Panevėžys

Slam Dunk Contest

 Selected as wild card participant.
 Šarūnas Beniušis was unable to participate due to an illness

Three-Point Contest

 Selected as wild card participants.
 Lukas Aukštikalnis was selected as Adas Juškevičius replacement.
 Dovis Bičkauskis was selected as Simas Buterlevičius replacement
 Anthony Ireland was selected as Jerry Johnson replacement.

Final

All-Tournament Team
 PG –  Dominik Mavra 
 SG –  Ben Madgen
 SF –  Edgaras Ulanovas (MVP)
 PF –  Aaron White
 C  –  Martynas Echodas

References

2018
2017–18 in Lithuanian basketball
February 2018 sports events in Europe
Sports competitions in Klaipėda
21st century in Klaipėda